Rafael Epifanio Zubarán Capmany (7 April 1875 – 1 February 1948) was a Mexican lawyer from Campeche who acted as the Mexican Minister of Interior and a representative for the ABC nations in 1914 during the Niagara Falls peace conference. He was Mexican Secretary of Economy from 1920 to 1922.

References

1875 births
1948 deaths
Mexican Secretaries of the Interior
People from Campeche